Holme Moor railway station was a station on the Selby to Driffield Line in the East Riding of Yorkshire, England serving the village of Holme-on-Spalding-Moor. It opened as Holme (Yorks) on 1 August 1848 and was renamed Holme Moor on 1 July 1923. It closed on 20 September 1954.

References

External links
 Holme Moor station on navigable 1947 O. S. map
 

Disused railway stations in the East Riding of Yorkshire
Former York and North Midland Railway stations
Railway stations in Great Britain opened in 1848
Railway stations in Great Britain closed in 1954